is a station on the Tama Toshi Monorail Line in Tachikawa, Tokyo, Japan.

Lines
Sunagawa-Nanaban Station is a station on the Tama Toshi Monorail Line and is located 2.5 kilometers from the terminus of the line at Kamikitadai Station.

Station layout
Sunagawa-Nanaban Station is a raised station with two tracks and two opposed side platforms, with the station building located underneath. It is a standardized station building for this monorail line.

Platforms

History
The station opened on 27 November 1998.

Station numbering was introduced in February 2018 with Sunagawa-Nanaban being assigned TT16.

Surrounding area
The station is above Tokyo Metropolitan Route 43 (Imokubo Kaidō) at its intersection with Tokyo Metropolitan Route 7 (Itsukaichi Kaidō). The surrounding area is an older residential area, but apartment buildings and shops have begun appearing since the opening of the station. Other points of interest include:
 Tachikawa City Library, Saiwai Branch
 Kobushi Kaikan
 Tachikawa Kominkaen

References

External links

 Tama Monorail Sunagawa-Nanaban Station 

Railway stations in Japan opened in 1998
Railway stations in Tokyo
Tama Toshi Monorail
Tachikawa, Tokyo